Marco Crimi (born 17 March 1990) is an Italian footballer who plays as a midfielder for  club Triestina. He plays as a defensive midfielder, but can also play as a right back. He is a former Italy under-21 international.

Club career
Crimi born in Messina, started his career at his home town team Messina before joining Igea Virtus as a free agent. His form earned him a move to Serie A side Bari.

Bari
Crimi joined Serie A side Bari in 2009. He made his Bari debut in the Italian Cup on 28 October 2010 in a 3–1 win against Torino. On 10 November 2010, he made his Serie A debut replacing Alessandro Gazzi as a substitute in a match against ChievoVerona.

Grosseto
He earned a subsequent loan move to Grosseto on 31 January 2011. He made his debut in Serie B on 5 February 2011, in Grosseto's 1–0 loss to Novara. On 23 June 2011, Grosseto bought out 50% of his rights in a co-ownership deal, for a fee of €300,000. The co-ownership deal was renewed in June 2012.

After becoming a regular starter at Grosseto, Crimi was frozen out of the first team along with teammates Yaw Asante, Davis Curiale and Giovanni Formiconi all being in a car involved in an accident where the driver had been drink driving.

In June 2013, Grosseto acquired Crimi outright from Bari.

Latina
On 3 September 2013, Crimi joined Serie B side Latina on loan. His impressive form in the heart of the midfield, led Latina to an impressive 3rd-place finish in Serie B, after helping beat his former club Bari in two legs in the Serie Bplay-off semi-final, Latina were undone 4–2 on aggregate by Cesena in the two legged final for promotion to Serie A.

In June 2014, Latina excised the option to sign Crimi outright.

Bologna
Crimi joined Bologna on 20 August 2015 for a €730,000 fee, with Daniele Paponi moving in the opposite direction for free. Crimi signed a reported three-year contract, worth €250,000 a year.

Carpi
On 4 January 2016, Serie A side Carpi had reached an agreement for the loan of Crimi until the end of the season, with a buyout option.

On 21 June 2016, Carpi announced that they had activated the buyout clause to sign Crimi on a two-year deal, for a fee of €500,000.

Cesena
On 31 January 2017, Crimi joined Cesena on a temporary deal, with an obligation to buy.

Virtus Entella
On 31 August 2017, Crimi was sold to fellow Serie B club Virtus Entella.

Reggina
On 29 January 2021 he joined Reggina on a 1.5-year contract.

Triestina
On 31 August 2021, he moved to Triestina.

International career
On 4 November 2011, he received his first call-up to Italy U-21 by Ciro Ferrara for the double engagement with Turkey and Hungary qualifier for the UEFA European Under-21 qualifiers. Becoming the first player in the history of Grosseto to play in the Under-21s.

On 27 May 2013, he was included as Devis Mangia in the 23-man squad to for European Under-21 Championship in Israel, where Italy finished in second place with Spain beating Italy 4-2 in the final on 18 June, with Crimi making 3 appearances in all the tournament.

Honours
Italy U21
2013 UEFA European Under-21 Championship Runner-up

References

External links
 FIGC 
 AIC profile (data by football.it) 

1990 births
Living people
Sportspeople from Messina
Footballers from Sicily
Italian footballers
Association football midfielders
Serie A players
Serie B players
Serie C players
S.S.C. Bari players
F.C. Grosseto S.S.D. players
Latina Calcio 1932 players
Bologna F.C. 1909 players
A.C. Carpi players
A.C. Cesena players
Virtus Entella players
Spezia Calcio players
Reggina 1914 players
U.S. Triestina Calcio 1918 players
Italy under-21 international footballers